The Hessell-Tiltman History Prize is awarded to the best work of non-fiction of historical content covering a period up to and including World War II, and published in the year of the award.  The books are to be of high literary merit, but not primarily academic.  The prize is organized by the English PEN. Marjorie Hessell-Tiltman was a member of PEN during the 1960s and 1970s; on her death in 1999 she bequeathed £100,000 to the PEN Literary Foundation to found a prize in her name. Each year's winner receives £2,000.

The award is one of many PEN awards sponsored by PEN International affiliates in over 145 PEN centres around the world.

Winners and shortlist
A blue ribbon denotes the winner.

2000s

2002
 Margaret MacMillan, Peacemakers: The Paris Peace Conference of 1919 and Its Attempt to End War

2003
William Dalrymple, White Mughals: Love and Betrayal in 18th Century India
Geoffrey Moorhouse, The Pilgrimage of Grace: The Rebellion that Shook Henry VIII's Throne
Munro Price, The Fall of the French Monarchy: Louis XVI, Marie Antoinette and the Baron de Breteuil
 Jenny Uglow, The Lunar Men: The Friends who Made the Future 1730–1810
A.N. Wilson, The Victorians

2004
 James Buchan, Capital of the Mind: How Edinburgh Changed the World
 Norman Davies, Rising '44. The Battle for Warsaw
 Richard A. Fletcher, The Cross and the Crescent: The Dramatic Story of the Earliest Encounters Between Christians and Muslims
 Tom Holland, Rubicon: The Last Years of the Roman Republic
 Diarmaid MacCulloch, Reformation: Europe’s House Divided 1490-1700

2005
Joachim Fest, Inside Hitler's Bunker: The Last Days of the Third Reich
 Paul Fussell, The Boys' Crusade: The American Infantry in Northwestern Europe, 1944–1945 (joint winners)
Mark Mazower, Salonica, City of Ghosts: Christians, Muslims and Jews, 1430–1950
 Richard Overy, The Dictators: Hitler's Germany, Stalin's Russia (joint winners)
Jonathan Phillips, The Fourth Crusade and the Sack of Constantinople

2006
Charles Townshend, Easter 1916: The Irish Rebellion 
Simon Schama, Rough Crossings: Britain, the Slaves and the American Revolution
 Bryan Ward-Perkins, The Fall of Rome and the End of Civilization

2007
Jerry Brotton, The Sale of the Late King's Goods: Charles I and His Art Collection 
Deborah Cohen, Household Gods: The British and Their Possessions
William Dalrymple, The Last Mughal: The Fall of a Dynasty, Delhi 1857
J. H. Elliott, Empires of the Atlantic World – Britain and Spain in America, 1492–1830
 Vic Gatrell, City of Laughter:  Sex and Satire in Eighteenth-Century London
Adam Tooze, The Wages of Destruction: The Making and Breaking of the Nazi Economy

2008
Mark Mazower, Hitler's Empire: Nazi Rule in Occupied Europe 
Philipp Blom, The Vertigo Years: Change and Culture in the West 1900–1914
Leo Hollis, The Phoenix: St Paul's Cathedral and the Men Who Made Modern London 
Frederick Spotts, The Shameful Peace: How French Artists and Intellectuals Survived the Nazi Occupation
 Clair Wills, That Neutral Island

2009
 Mark Thompson, The White War: Life & Death on the Italian Front 1915–1919

2010s

2010
Dominic Lieven, Russia Against Napoleon: The Battle for Europe, 1807 to 1814
 Diarmaid MacCulloch, A History of Christianity: The First Three Thousand Years
Amanda Vickery, Behind Closed Doors: at Home in Georgian London

2011
Amanda Foreman, A World on Fire: an Epic History of Two Nations Divided
Philip Mansel, Levant: Splendour and Catastrophe in the Mediterranean
Roger Moorhouse, Berlin at War: Life and Death in Hitler's Capital 1939–1945
 Toby Wilkinson, The Rise and Fall of Ancient Egypt: the History of a Civilisation from 3000 BC to Cleopatra

2012
Lizzie Collingham, The Taste of War: World War II and the Battle for Food
Norman Davies, Vanished Kingdoms: The History of Half-Forgotten Europe
David Edgerton, Britain's War Machine: Weapons, Resources and Experts in the Second World War
 James Gleick, The Information: A History, a Theory, a Flood
Edward J. Larson, An Empire of Ice: Scott, Shackleton, and the Heroic Age of Antarctic Science
Adam Hochschild, To End All Wars: A Story of Loyalty and Rebellion, 1914–1918

2013
Jerry Brotton, A History of the World in Twelve Maps 
Chris Clark, The Sleepwalkers: How Europe Went to War in 1914 
Nigel Cliff, The Last Crusade: The Epic Voyages of Vasco da Gama 
Jonathan Dimbleby, Destiny in the Desert: The Road to El Alamein
 Keith Lowe, Savage Continent: Europe in the Aftermath of World War II
Mark Mazower, Governing the World: The History of an Idea

2014
David Crane, Empires of the Dead: How One Man’s Vision led to the Creation of WWI's World Graves
William Dalrymple, Return of a King: The Battle for Afghanistan
Vic Gatrell, The First Bohemians: Life and Art in London's Golden Age
Charlotte Higgins, Under Another Sky: Journeys in Roman Britain
 David Reynolds, The Long Shadow: The Great War and the Twentieth Century
Carl Watkins, The Undiscovered Country: Journeys Among the Dead

2015
Mark Bostridge, The Fateful Year: England 1914
 Jessie Childs, God's Traitors: Terror and Faith in Elizabethan England
Ronald Hutton, Pagan Britain
Robert Tombs, The English and Their History
Jenny Uglow, In These Times: Living in Britain through Napoleon's Wars

2016
Mary Beard, SPQR: A History of Ancient Rome
Peter Frankopan, The Silk Roads: A New History of the World
Sarah Helm, If This is A Woman – Inside Ravensbruck: Hitler's Concentration Camp for Women
Raghu Karnad, The Farthest Field: An Indian Story of the Second World War
James S. Shapiro,  1606: William Shakespeare and the Year of Lear
 Nicholas Stargardt, The German War: A Nation Under Arms, 1939-1945

2017
The shortlist was announced 7 June 2017. The winner was announced 10 July.
Sarah Bakewell, At The Existentialist Café: Freedom, Being, and Apricot Cocktails
Jerry Brotton, This Orient Isle: Elizabethan England and the Islamic World
Susan L. Carruthers, The Good Occupation: American Soldiers and the Hazards of Peace
Dan Cruickshank, Spitalfields: The History of a Nation in a Handful of Streets
Frank Dikötter, The Cultural Revolution: A People's History, 1962–1976
 David Olusoga, Black and British: A Forgotten History
Tim Whitmarsh, Battling the Gods: Atheism in the Ancient World

2018
The shortlist was announced 22 March 2018. The winner was announced 24 June 2018.

Stephen Alford, London's Triumph: Merchant Adventurers and the Tudor City
Anne Applebaum, Red Famine: Stalin's War on Ukraine
Masha Gessen, The Future is History: How Totalitarianism Reclaimed Russia
Christopher J. Lebron, The Making of Black Lives Matter: A Brief History of an Idea
Lynda Nead, The Tiger in the Smoke: Art and Culture in Post-War Britain
 S. A. Smith, Russia in Revolution: An Empire in Crisis, 1890-1928

2019
The winner was announced 4 December 2019.

 Edward Wilson-Lee, The Catalogue of Shipwrecked Books: Young Columbus and the Quest for a Universal Library

2020s

2020
The shortlist was announced on 29 October 2020. The winner was announced on 1 December 2020.

 Anita Anand, The Patient Assassin: A True Tale of Massacre, Revenge, and the Raj 
Julia Blackburn, Time Song: Searching for Doggerland
Hazel Carby, Imperial: A Tale of Two Islands
Toby Green, A Fistful of Shells: West Africa from the Rise of the Slave Trade to the Age of Revolution 
Caroline Moorhead, A House in the Mountains: The Women Who Liberated Italy from Fascism
Thomas Penn, The Brothers York: An English Tragedy
Roel Sterckx, Chinese Thought: From Confucius to Cook Ding

2021
The shortlist was announced on 14 October 2021 and the winner on 7 December.
Barbara Demick, Eat the Buddha: Life and Death in a Tibetan Town
Chris Gosden, The History of Magic: From Alchemy to Witchcraft, from the Ice Age to the Present
Helen McCarthy, Double Lives: A History of Working Motherhood
Sinclair McKay, Dresden: The Fire and the Darkness
Sujit Sivasundaram, Waves Across the South: A New History of Revolution and Empire
Ben Wilson, Metropolis
 Rebecca Wragg Sykes, Kindred: Neanderthal Life, Love, Death and Art

2022
The shortlist was announced on 7 October 2022.
Rebecca Birrell, This Dark Country: Women Artists, Still Life and Intimacy in the Early Twentieth Century
Raphael Cormack, Midnight in Cairo: The Female Stars of Egypt’s Roaring ’20s — honourable mention
Amitav Ghosh, The Nutmeg's Curse
Julie Kavanagh, The Irish Assassins: Conspiracy, Revenge and the Murders that Stunned an Empire
Louis Menand, The Free World: Art and Thought in the Cold War
Ian Sanjay Patel, We’re Here Because You Were There: Immigration and the End of Empire
 Francesca Stavrakopoulou, God: An Anatomy

See also

 List of history awards

References

External links
 https://www.englishpen.org/prizes/pen-hessell-tiltman-prize/ – Archive & History

Awards established in 2002
2002 establishments in England
English PEN awards
History awards
British non-fiction literary awards